Dry Doc (1968-1997) was an AQHA registered American Quarter Horse stallion by Doc Bar and the second as well as the last foal of the champion cutting mare Poco Lena.  Dry Doc was a cutting horse and sire of cutting horses.

Life
Foaled in 1968, Dry Doc was by Doc Bar, and the second and last foal of the champion cutting mare Poco Lena.  He was a full brother to Doc O'Lena.  Dry Doc was inducted into the NCHA Hall of Fame in 1980, joining ranks with his dam and full brother. Dry Doc was inducted into the Michigan Quarter Horse Association Hall of Fame in 1997. Dry Doc was a bay, bred and owned by Dr. and Mrs. Stephen F. Jensen of Paicines, California at the time of registration.

Pedigree

References

American Quarter Horse sires
NCHA Hall of Fame (horses)
Cutting horses